Orbital surface may refer to:

 Orbitofrontal cortex
 Orbital surface of body of maxilla